George Lorenzo Otis (October 7, 1829 – March 29, 1882) was a lawyer and politician in the U.S. state of Minnesota. He served as the 14th mayor of Saint Paul, Minnesota, and also in both houses of the state legislature. Otis ran for Governor of Minnesota in 1869 as a Democrat, but lost to Republican Horace Austin, receiving 46.6% of the vote.

Otis was born in Homer, New York to Isaac Otis (1798–1853) and Caroline Abigail Curtiss in 1829. He married Mary Virginia Morrison in 1858.

References

1829 births
1882 deaths
Members of the Minnesota House of Representatives
Mayors of Saint Paul, Minnesota
Minnesota state senators
People from Cortland County, New York
Minnesota lawyers
19th-century American politicians
19th-century American lawyers